Kenneth Myers may refer to:
 Ken Myers, American rower
 Kenneth A. Myers III, director of the Defense Threat Reduction Agency
 Kenneth Arthur Myers (1935–2021), Australian surgeon
 Kenneth M. Myers, American politician in Florida
 Kenny Myers, executive at Mercury Records
 Ken Myers, radio broadcaster and audio journal host, see Mars Hill Audio

See also
 Kenneth Myers Centre, a landmark building in Auckland, New Zealand
 Kenneth J. Meyer (born 1959), American politician from Tennessee
 Ken Myer (1921–1992), American-born Australian philanthropist